Julia Morales Clark (born April 12, 1985)  is a sports anchor and reporter for AT&T SportsNet Southwest as well as the Houston Astros' sideline reporter, pregame and post game talk show star. She is in her 9th season of broadcasting for the Astros and Rockets. Prior to taking her job with AT&T SportsNet Southwest, she was a reporter for Time Warner Cable News. During her time, she broadcast big events including the Super Bowl, NBA Finals, and the World Series.

Before working for AT&T SportsNet Southwest, Morales spent time as a reporter at KTEN-TV in Sherman, Texas, KYTX CBS 19 in Tyler, Texas, and Your News Now in Austin, Texas. Morales is a graduate of the University of Texas, where she was a member of the Pom spirit group. She was on the sidelines for the Longhorns' national championship win in Pasadena in 2005.

Personal life 
She is the daughter of Victor M. Morales, 1996 Democratic nominee for U.S. Senate in Texas.

She is married to former MLB player Matt Clark, and is the daughter-in-law of former pitcher Terry Clark through this marriage.The two were together for five years before they decided to get married in November 2015.

References

University of Texas alumni
American women journalists
Living people
1983 births
21st-century American women